Cheay Areng Dam was a proposed 108 MW hydroelectric dam on Areng river in Koh Kong Province, southwest of Cambodia. 

China Guodian Corporation once intended to build the dam. Sinohydro Resources Ltd, a holding company for Sinohydro Group, was granted approval in February 2014 for six months of extensive drilling, geological mapping and prospecting in the dam concession. 

The project was shelved in 2017 by Prime Minister Hun Sen due to a strong local opposition to the dam. A new coal plant will be constructed in Preah Sihanouk as a compensation.

Environmental and social concerns 
Cheay Areng Dam was to be built in the Central Cardamom Protected Forest (CCPF), largest unbroken tract of woodland in Southeast Asia, covering 4,013 km². This area, made up of a series of adjoining national parks, hosts a high biodiversity including 31 endangered animal species, among which the world’s second-largest population of wild Siamese crocodile. 

Furthermore, the dam would flow a 20 km² area from which 1500 Chong indigenous people would have to be relocated. Buddhist monks and villagers are against the project. , local residents continue to oppose construction of the dam, which would provide power principally to neighboring countries.

References

Hydroelectric power stations in Cambodia
Dams in Cambodia
Koh Kong province
Cancelled hydroelectric power stations
Dam controversies